Emory Ryan Cole (September 3, 1893 – August 16, 1968) was a lawyer and state legislator in Maryland. He served in the Maryland House of Delegates.

He served in the U.S. military. He graduated from Howard University. He was a Republican. He lost his 1958 re-election campaign to Verda F. Welcome.

References

1893 births
1968 deaths
Republican Party members of the Maryland House of Delegates
Military personnel from Baltimore
Howard University School of Law alumni
African-American state legislators in Maryland
20th-century African-American politicians
20th-century American politicians
African-American men in politics
African-American United States Army personnel
United States Army personnel of World War I
United States Army soldiers
People from Cockeysville, Maryland
Lawyers from Baltimore
Burials at Baltimore National Cemetery
Politicians from Baltimore
Members of the Benevolent and Protective Order of Elks
American Freemasons